Heimbold is a surname. Notable people with the surname include:

Charles A. Heimbold Jr. (born 1933), American businessman and diplomat
Pete Francis Heimbold (born 1975), American musician